Peter Frühauf (born 15 August 1982 in Prešov) is a Slovak former professional ice hockey defenceman.

Frühauf played in the Slovak Extraliga for HC Košice, MsHK Žilina, HKm Zvolen, HC '05 Banská Bystrica, HC Slovan Bratislava and HK Dukla Trenčín. He also played in the Czech Extraliga for HC Oceláři Třinec, Motor České Budějovice, Mountfield HK, HC Stadion Litoměřice and HC Plzeň.

He participated at the 2010 IIHF World Championship as a member of the Slovakia men's national ice hockey team.

Career statistics

References

External links
 
 

1982 births
Living people
HC '05 Banská Bystrica players
HC Košice players
HC Oceláři Třinec players
HC Plzeň players
HC Prešov players
HC Slovan Bratislava players
HC Stadion Litoměřice players
HK Dukla Trenčín players
HK 2016 Trebišov players
HKM Zvolen players
Motor České Budějovice players
MsHK Žilina players
Slovak ice hockey defencemen
Sportspeople from Prešov
Stadion Hradec Králové players
Topeka Scarecrows players
Slovak expatriate ice hockey players in the United States
Slovak expatriate ice hockey players in the Czech Republic